Ria Berg is Director of the Institutum Romanum Finlandiae (Rome), also known as The Finnish Institute in Rome. The Finnish Institute is an academic institution that supports research in the Humanities, particularly in relation to Ancient History and Italy. Berg is a Professor of Archaeology. She specialises in Pompeii, material domestic space and objects, Roman mirrors, and gender archaeology.

Education 
Berg received her PhD from the University of Helsinki in 2010. Her doctoral thesis was entitled, Il mundus muliebris nelle fonti latine e nei contesti pompeiani.

Career 
Berg was appointed as Director of the Institutum Romanum Finlandiae in August 2021. She was previously assistant (2001-5) and then deputy director (2012-16) of the Institute.

Bibliography 

 Tangible Religion. Materiality of Domestic Cult Practices from Antiquity to Early Modern Era, ed. by Ria Berg, Antonella Coralini, and Anu Kaisa Koponen (Quasar, 2021)

References 

Finnish academics
Women classical scholars
Classical scholars
Archaeologists
Historians of antiquity
Year of birth missing (living people)
Living people